= G. Marshall Molen =

American engineer

G. Marshall Molen is an American engineer currently at Mississippi State University. He is a former Distinguished Engineering Professor.
